The NER Class F (LNER Class D22) was a class of 4-4-0 steam locomotives of the North Eastern Railway. It was designed by Thomas William Worsdell and introduced in 1887.

History
Class F (compound expansion) and Class F1 (simple expansion) 4-4-0s were developments of T.W. Worsdell's  experimental Class D 2-4-0. The Class Ds were two-cylinder compounds of the von Borries type. However, the 2-4-0 wheel arrangement was found unsuitable and this led to the development of the Class F 4-4-0.

Between 1896 and 1911 all the Class D, F and F1 locomotives were rebuilt into one 4-4-0 class with 18in x 24in simple expansion cylinders, piston valves, and Stephenson valve gear. They had been built with slide valves and Joy valve gear. The combined class was designated "Class F" from 1914. Superheaters were fitted between 1913 and 1920.

Dimensions
The information box (above right) shows the dimensions after 1911. Before this, dimensions varied:
 Boiler pressure: 140, 160 or 175 psi
 Cylinders (compound): one  and one 
 Cylinders (simple): two

Use
They were initially used for express passenger services.  Between 1892 and 1894 they were displaced by newer locomotives and relegated to secondary duties. By the time of the 1923 Grouping, they had been further relegated and were typically used for branch line stopping trains.

Withdrawal
They were withdrawn between 1927 and 1935 and none were preserved.

References

4-4-0 locomotives
F
Railway locomotives introduced in 1887
Scrapped locomotives
Standard gauge steam locomotives of Great Britain
Passenger locomotives